The South Caucasian nation of Georgia is home to several protected areas, which receive protection because of their environmental, cultural or similar value. The oldest of these – now known as the Lagodekhi Protected Areas – dates back to 1912, when Georgia was part of the Russian Empire.

In addition  of marine area protected, or 0.67% of the country’s territorial waters. The are a total of 89 protected areas, including 14 Strict Nature Reserves, 12 National Parks, 20 Managed Nature Reserves, 40 Natural Monuments, 2 Ramsar sites and 1 Protected Landscape. Strict nature reserves comprise 140,672 ha, while national parks cover 276,724 ha. The total number of visitors to Georgia's protected areas was just under 1.2 million in 2019.

Strict Nature Reserves

National parks

Managed Reserves

Natural Monuments

Ramsar sites 
Wetlands of Central Kolkheti
Ispani Mire

Protected Landscapes
 Tusheti Protected Landscape

Planned protected areas 
Central Caucasus Protected Areas
Khvamli Planned Managed Reserve
Trialeti Planned National Park

See also 
 Environmental issues in Georgia

References 

protected areas
protected areas
Georgia
Protected areas